The 2018–19 Alabama–Huntsville Chargers ice hockey team represented the University of Alabama in Huntsville in the 2018–19 NCAA Division I men's ice hockey season. The Chargers were coached by Mike Corbett who was in his sixth season as head coach. His assistant coaches were Gavin Morgan and Lance West. The Chargers played their home games in the Propst Arena at the Von Braun Center and competed in the Western Collegiate Hockey Association.

Recruiting
UAH added 8 freshmen and 2 transfers for the 2018–19 season, including 1 goalie, 5 forwards and 4 defenseman.

Roster

Departures from 2017–18 team
Richard Buri, D, graduated
Cody Champagne, D, graduated
Josh Kestner, F, graduated, signed with the Toronto Marlies (AHL)
Jordan Larson, F, transferred to Lakehead University (U Sports)
Max McHugh, F, graduated
Brandon Parker, D, graduated
Tyler Poulsen, F, signed with the Allen Americans (ECHL)
Brennan Saulnier, F, graduated, signed with the Florida Everblades (ECHL)
Jordan Uhelski, G, graduated, transferred to Miami (OH)

2018–19 team
Source:

|}

Schedule and results
  Green background indicates win.
  Red background indicates loss.
  Yellow background indicates tie.

|-
!colspan=12 style=""| Regular Season

|-
!colspan=12 style=""| WCHA Tournament

Standings

Player stats
As of March 9, 2019

Skaters

Goalies

References

Alabama–Huntsville Chargers men's ice hockey seasons
Alabama Huntsville
Alabama-Huntsville Chargers men's ice hockey
Alabama-Huntsville Chargers men's ice hockey